Consanguine marriage is marriage between individuals who are closely related. Though it may involve incest, it implies more than the sexual nature of incest. In a clinical sense, marriage between two family members who are second cousins or closer qualifies as consanguineous marriage. This is  based on the gene copies their offspring may receive. Though these unions are still prevalent in some communities, as seen across the Greater Middle East region, many other populations have seen a great decline in intra-family marriages.

Prevalence and stigma 

Globally, 8.5% of children have consanguineous parents, and 20% of the human population live in communities practicing endogamy. Theories on the developments of consanguineous marriage as a taboo can be supported as being both a social, and a biological development.

Social factors 
In a social perspective, the observed inclination to practice consanguinity has been due to advantages to social and financial status. Upholding familial structure and assets, and ease of marital arrangements are valued among consanguineous marriages. Low age and a lack of awareness of the consequences of inbreeding are common in consanguineous marriages.

Consanguineous marriage is present in every religion, and cannot be accredited to any one religious mandate.  Consanguinity is practiced regardless of religious influences and is a result of cultural, historical, regional, and socio-economic factors. A greater number of consanguineous marriages are observed in rural areas compared to urban areas within the same region. This is attributed to the tendency of individuals in rural areas to marry at younger ages, have a lower socio-economic status, and lesser education than those who live in urban areas. Parent's grade of job has also been credited as a factor.

In cases of incest involving a child and adult, legislation usually considers it to be a form of child sexual abuse.

Epidemiological features 
Multiple studies have established consanguinity as a high cause for birth defects and abnormalities. A risk of autosomal recessive disorders increases in offspring coming from consanguineous marriages due to the increased likelihood of receiving recessive genes from cognate parents. According to population based case-control studies, a higher risk of stillbirth is associated with consanguineous marriages.

Inbreeding is associated with decreased cognitive abilities in children.

Younger ages of marriage are commonly seen in consanguineous marriages, which may account for the increase in fertility seen in these unions. Chances of postnatal mortality are higher in offspring. The first year holds the highest chance of death due to the risk of autosomal recessive genes. This is also the cause of health complications as children born from consanguinity enter adulthood.

See also
 Cousin marriage
 Coefficient of relationship
 Laws regarding incest
 Xwedodah

References

Further reading

External links

 
 
 
 
 

Types of marriage
Genealogy
Incest
Medical genetics
Endogamy